Providence is an unincorporated community in White County, Arkansas, United States.

Providence is the nearest populated place to J.C. Rhew Co. Packing Shed, which is listed on the U.S. National Register of Historic Places.

References

Unincorporated communities in White County, Arkansas
Unincorporated communities in Arkansas